The 2018 F3 Asian Championship was a multi-event, Formula 3 open-wheel single seater motor racing championship held across Asia. The championship features a mix of professional and amateur drivers, competing in Formula 3 cars that conform to the FIA Formula 3 regulations for the championship. This is the inaugural season of the championship.

The season commenced on 14 July at Sepang International Circuit and concluded on 25 November at the same venue, after fifteen races to be held at five meetings.

Teams and drivers

Race calendar
The calendar was announced on 26 January 2018.

Championship standings

Scoring system
Points are awarded to the top ten drivers.

Drivers' Championship

Notes:
† — Drivers did not finish the race, but were classified as they completed over 75% of the race distance.

Masters Cup

Footnotes

References

External links
 
 

Asian F3
F3 Asian Championship
Asian F3